Dan Vado (born September 9, 1959) is an American comic book publisher and writer, and a fixture of the independent comics community. Vado is the owner, president, and publisher of Slave Labor Graphics, better known as SLG Publishing.

Biography
Vado started Slave Labor (SLG) in 1986 and is still its lone owner. The books Vado initially chose to publish were done by his personal friends, many of them acquaintances from high school. Even after more than twenty years in the business, Vado continues to publish books he "genuinely like[s]" rather than what he thinks the market is looking for.

His writing credits include Barabbas (Mirage Studios), Batman: Legends of the Dark Knight (DC Comics), Bill The Clown (Slave Labor), Extreme Justice (DC), Haunted Mansion (Slave Labor), Hero Sandwich (Slave Labor), Justice League America (DC), and Universal Monsters: Dracula (Dark Horse Comics). He also founded the Alternative Press Expo, one of the first comics conventions dedicated to alternative comics and self-publishers.

While it is presumed SLG Publishing has ceased operation, it has mainly just cut back and only publishes 2-3 books per year. Currently Dan runs The Art Boutiki Music Hall in San Jose, voted as one of the top 35 jazz clubs in the USA by All About Jazz, and also does consulting for prospective comics publishers and creators.

During the Covid lockdowns Vado began a book about fortune cookies which will also double as a memoir of sorts. The still untitled book will be released at the end of 2021.

Personal life
Vado is well known throughout the comics community for his opinionated, plain-spoken, and humorous nature. He is also an amateur cook with a predilection for "beer can chicken." He lives in San Jose, California, is married, and is the father of two sons.

Awards
Vado won an Inkpot Award in 2007.

Notes

References

Slave Labor Graphics
1959 births
Living people
American comics writers
American writers of Italian descent
Inkpot Award winners